The Venezuela men's national 3x3 team is a national basketball team of Venezuela, administered by the Federación Venezolana de Baloncesto.

It represents the country in international 3x3 (3 against 3) basketball competitions.

The team competed at the 2019 World Beach Games in Doha, Qatar.

See also
Venezuela women's national 3x3 team
Venezuela men's national basketball team

References

3x3
Men's national 3x3 basketball teams